Hans Daniel Johan Wallengren (8 June 1823 – 25 October 1894) was a Swedish clergyman and entomologist.

Biography
He was born in Lund, Sweden.
Wallengren became a student at Lund University from 1842, was ordained a priest in 1847 and was appointed parish priest at  Farhult  and Jonstorp parishes. Wallengren was responsible for studying and naming the butterflies collected by naturalist and explorer Johan August Wahlberg (1810–1856) at Kafferland (now Cape Province in South Africa).

Selected works
Lepidoptera Scandinavioæ Rhopalocera (1853)
Skandinaviens Heterocerfjärilar: I. Closterocera (1863), II. Spinnarna (1869–85)
Coleophorer (1859)
Fjädermott (1860)
Lepidoptera nova (1861 i "Fregatten Eugenies resa omkring jorden 1851–53")
Lepidoptera rhopalocera in terra Caffrorum collecta (1857)
Heterocerfjärilar, samlade i kafferlandet af J.A. Wahlberg, Index specierum, Noctuarum et Geometrarum in Scandinavia hucusque detectarum (1874)
Species Tortricum et Tinearum Scandinaviæ (1875)

References

External links
MRN Papilio anthemenes a butterfly described by Hans Wallengren.
 Biography (Swedish)

1823 births
1894 deaths
People from Lund
Lund University alumni
Swedish entomologists
19th-century Swedish Lutheran priests